Tan Ya (born July 18, 1992 in Huaihua, Hunan) is a male Chinese slalom canoeist who has competed since 2008.

He finished in 19th place in the K1 event at the 2016 Summer Olympics in Rio de Janeiro.

Tan won a gold medal in the K1 event at the 2010 Asian Championships in Xiasi and again at the 2016 Asian Championships in Toyama and 2010 Xiasi Asian Championships.

Tan trains at the Heyuan Water Sports Centre, Guangdong. He represents Guangdong in domestic competitions.

World Cup individual podiums

1 Asian Canoe Slalom Championship counting for World Cup points

References

1992 births
Living people
People from Huaihua
Sportspeople from Hunan
Sportspeople from Guangdong
Olympic canoeists of China
Canoeists at the 2016 Summer Olympics
Canoeists at the 2014 Asian Games
Chinese male canoeists
Asian Games competitors for China